Zhou may refer to:

Chinese history
 King Zhou of Shang (1105 BC–1046 BC), the last king of the Shang dynasty
 Predynastic Zhou, 11th-century BC precursor to the Zhou dynasty
 Zhou dynasty (1046 BC–256 BC), a dynasty of China
 Western Zhou (1046 BC–771 BC)
 Eastern Zhou (770 BC–256 BC)
 Western Zhou (state) (440 BC–256 BC)
 Eastern Zhou (state) (367 BC–249 BC)
 Northern Zhou (557–581), one of the Northern dynasties during the Northern and Southern dynasties period
 Wu Zhou (690–705), an imperial dynasty established by Wu Zetian
 Later Zhou (951–960), the last of the Five dynasties during the Five Dynasties and Ten Kingdoms period
 Zhou (Zhang Shicheng's kingdom) (1354–1367), a state founded by Zhang Shicheng during the Red Turban Rebellion
 Zhou (Qing period state) (1678–1681), a state founded by Wu Sangui during the Qing dynasty

Other uses
Zhou (surname), Chinese surname
Zhou (country subdivision), a political/administrative division of China
Congee, a type of porridge
Zhou (Dota) is a Dota/Dota2 player who won The International 2012 as team captain.

See also
Chou (disambiguation)